Chester is a city and is also the county town of Cheshire, United Kingdom.

Chester may also refer to:

Places

Canada
Chester, Nova Scotia
Chester (TTC), a subway station in Toronto
Rural Municipality of Chester No. 125, Saskatchewan

United Kingdom
Chester (district), former local government area containing the city of Chester
Chester-le-Street, County Durham

United States
Chester, Arkansas
Chester, California, in Plumas County
Chester, Connecticut
Chester, Georgia
Chester, Idaho
Chester, Illinois
Chester, Indiana
Chester, Iowa
Chester, Maine
Chester, Maryland
Chester, Massachusetts, a New England town
Chester (CDP), Massachusetts, the main village in the town
Chester, Minnesota
Chester, Mississippi
Chester, Montana
Chester, Nebraska
Chester, New Hampshire
Chester, Orange County, New York
Chester (village), New York, within the town in Orange County
Chester, Warren County, New York
Chester, Ohio
Chester, Oklahoma
Chester, Pennsylvania
Chester, South Carolina
Chester, South Dakota
Chester, Texas
Chester, Vermont
Chester (CDP), Vermont
Chester, Virginia
Chester (Homeville, Virginia), listed on the NRHP in Virginia
Chester, West Virginia
Chester, Wisconsin
Chester Borough, New Jersey
Chester Creek, a tributary of the Delaware River
Chester Heights, Pennsylvania
Chester Hill, Pennsylvania
Chester River, a tributary of Chesapeake Bay
Chester Springs, Pennsylvania
Chester Township (disambiguation)

Other places
Chester City (disambiguation)
Chester County (disambiguation)

Animals
 Chester (horse) (1874–1888), an Australian thoroughbred racehorse and a leading sire
 Chester Cheetah, the mascot for the snack food Cheetos
 Chester White, a breed of domestic pig which originated in Chester County, Pennsylvania.

Arts, entertainment, and media
 Chester (band), a Canadian bubblegum pop band, active primarily from 1972 to 1975
 Chester (album), by Josh Rouse
 "Chester" (song), an American Revolutionary War anthem composed by William Billings

Ships
Chester-class cruiser
HMS Chester, disambiguation page
USS Chester (CA-27), a heavy cruiser commissioned in 1930
USS Chester (CL-1), a light cruiser in service from 1908 to 1921

Other uses
 Chester Beatty Library, in Dublin, Republic of Ireland
 Chester F.C. a football club based in Chester, England
 ChesterBus, a municipal bus company operating services in Cheshire, England
 Chester (given name)
 Chester (surname)
 Chester (placename element)
 Earl of Chester, another title of the Prince of Wales
 City of Chester (UK Parliament constituency) a constituency of the UK Parliament

See also
 Chester's, American chicken restaurant
 Chesters (disambiguation)
 
 Chesterfield (disambiguation)
 Chesterton (disambiguation)
 Chestertown (disambiguation)
 Chesterville (disambiguation)
 West Chester (disambiguation)